Robert Reinick (22 February 1805 – 7 February 1852) was a German painter and poet, associated with the Düsseldorf school of painting. One of his poems, Dem Vaterland, was set to music by Hugo Wolf and another, The Flight into Egypt was the libretto for a cantata by Max Bruch. He wrote the libretto to Schumann's opera Genoveva.

Reinick was born in Danzig (Gdańsk) and died in Dresden.

References

External links 

 Biografie Bayerische Staatsbibliothek
 Werkverzeichnis bei Litlinks.it
 Vertonung des Gedichts „Wie ist die Erde doch so schön”
 
 

1805 births
1852 deaths
19th-century German painters
19th-century German male artists
German male painters
German poets
Writers from Gdańsk
People from West Prussia
German male poets
19th-century poets
19th-century German writers
19th-century German male writers
Artists from Gdańsk
Düsseldorf school of painting